The women's 50 metre rifle three positions event at the 2018 Asian Games in Palembang, Indonesia took place on 21 August at the Jakabaring International Shooting Range.

Schedule
All times are Western Indonesia Time (UTC+07:00)

Records

Results

Qualification

Final

References

External links
 Shooting 50m Rifle 3 Positions Women
 Results at asia-shooting.org

Women's 50 metre rifle three positions